Chlorocichla is a genus of songbird in the bulbul family, Pycnonotidae. They are mainly present throughout the African tropical rainforest, excepted the yellow-bellied greenbul, native to the miombo woodlands.

Taxonomy 
The genus Chlorocichla was introduced in 1882 by the English ornithologist Richard Bowdler Sharpe. Sharpe did not specify a type species but this was designated as the yellow-bellied greenbul by Anton Reichenow in 1904–1905. The genus name combines the Ancient Greek khlōros meaning "pale green" or "yellow" with kikhlē meaning "thrush".

Species 

The genus contains five species:

 Joyful greenbul (Chlorocichla laetissima)
 Prigogine's greenbul (Chlorocichla prigoginei)
 Falkenstein's greenbul (Chlorocichla falkensteini)
 Yellow-bellied greenbul (Chlorocichla flaviventris)
 Simple greenbul (Chlorocichla simplex)

Former species 
Formerly, some authorities also considered the following species (or subspecies) as species within the genus Chlorocichla:
 Honeyguide greenbul (as Chlorocichla indicator,  now Baeopogon indicator)
 Yellow-throated leaflove (as Chlorocichla flavicollis, now Atimastillas flavicollis)

References

 
Bird genera
Greenbuls
 
Taxonomy articles created by Polbot